This is a list of chapters from the  manga by author Mizuki Kawashita. The series was first serialized in the Japanese magazine Weekly Shōnen Jump from February 2002 to August 2005 then collected and published into nineteen bound volumes by publisher Shueisha. A twelve episode anime adaptation and several OVAs were produced by Madhouse and roughly covered the first eight volumes of the manga. The anime aired on Animax and TV Asahi from April 2005 to July 2005.

Licensing rights to the series were acquired by Viz Media which first published the series in Germany after partnering with publishing house Tokyopop. The series was later translated in English for a North America release with the first volume seeing shelves in July 2007.



Volume list

Notes and references

External links 
 Shueisha's Ichigo 100% website

Lists of manga volumes and chapters